"Gange" (Italian for Ganges) is a song performed by Italian singer Francesca Michielin and featuring Italian rapper Shiva. The song was released on 21 February 2020 by RCA Records as the second single from her fourth studio album Feat (stato di natura), and co-written and produced by Adam11.

The song peaked at number 61 on the Italian Singles Chart.

Personnel
Credits adapted from Tidal.
 Davide Maddalena – producer, author
 Francesca Michielin – associated performer, author, vocals
 Shiva – featured artist, author, vocals

Track listing

Charts

References

2020 songs
2020 singles
Francesca Michielin songs